Allahabad is a city in the northern Indian state of Uttar Pradesh.

Allahabad may also refer to:

Places

Also in India
 Allahabad district, a district in Uttar Pradesh
 Allahabad division, a division in Uttar Pradesh
 Allahabad (Lok Sabha constituency), a parliamentary constituency
 Allahabad University, Prayagraj, Uttar Pradesh
 Illahabad Subah, a former Mughal top-level province

Iran 
 Allahabad, Iran (disambiguation), a list of numerous places in Iran

Pakistan 
 Allah Abad, Rahim Yar Khan, a town in Punjab
 Allahabad, Sindh, a town of Sindh
 Allahabad, Balochistan, a village of Lasbela District, Balochistan

Politics 
 Allahabad Address, the Presidential Address by Allama Iqbal
 Treaty of Allahabad, the treaty that marks the political and constitutional involvement and the beginning of British rule in India

Other uses 
 Allahabad (ship), an English ship that disappeared in 1886
 Allahabad Bank, the oldest joint stock bank in India

See also 
 Allahabadi (disambiguation)
 Allahdad